The oxygen minimum zone (OMZ), sometimes referred to as the shadow zone, is the zone in which oxygen saturation in seawater in the ocean is at its lowest. OMZs are found worldwide, typically along the western coast of continents, in areas where an interplay of physical and biological processes concurrently lower the oxygen concentration (biological processes) and restrict the water from mixing with surrounding waters (physical processes), creating a "pool" of water where oxygen concentrations fall from the normal range of 4–6 mg/L to below 2 mg/L.

Physical and biological processes 
Surface ocean waters generally have oxygen concentrations close to equilibrium with the Earth's atmosphere. In general, colder waters hold more oxygen than warmer waters. As water moves out of the mixed layer into the thermocline, it is exposed to a rain of organic matter from above. Aerobic bacteria feed on this organic matter; oxygen is used as part of the bacterial metabolic process, lowering its concentration within the water. Therefore, the concentration of oxygen in deep water is dependent on the amount of oxygen it had when it was at the surface, minus depletion by deep sea organisms.

The downward flux of organic matter decreases sharply with depth, with 80–90% being consumed in the top .  The deep ocean thus has higher oxygen because rates of oxygen consumption are low compared with the supply of cold, oxygen-rich deep waters from polar regions. In the surface layers, oxygen is supplied by photosynthesis of phytoplankton. Depths in between, however, have higher rates of oxygen consumption and lower rates of advective supply of oxygen-rich waters.  In much of the ocean, mixing processes enable the resupply of oxygen to these waters (see upwelling).

A distribution of the open-ocean oxygen minimum zones is controlled by the large-scale ocean circulation as well as local physical as well as biological processes. For example, wind blowing parallel to the coast causes Ekman transport that upwells nutrients from deep water.  The increased nutrients support phytoplankton blooms, zooplankton grazing, and an overall productive food web at the surface.  The byproducts of these blooms and the subsequent grazing sink in the form of particulate and dissolved nutrients (from phytodetritus, dead organisms, fecal pellets, excretions, shed shells, scales, and other parts).  This "rain" of organic matter (see the biological pump) feeds the microbial loop and may lead to bacterial blooms in water below the euphotic zone due to the influx of nutrients. Since oxygen is not being produced as a byproduct of photosynthesis below the euphotic zone, these microbes use up what oxygen is in the water as they break down the falling organic matter thus creating the lower oxygen conditions.

Physical processes then constrain the mixing and isolate this low oxygen water from outside water. Vertical mixing is constrained due to the separation from the mixed layer by depth. Horizontal mixing is constrained by bathymetry and boundaries formed by interactions with sub-tropical gyres and other major current systems. Low oxygen water may spread (by advection) from under areas of high productivity up to these physical boundaries to create a stagnant pool of water with no direct connection to the ocean surface even though (as in the Eastern Tropical North Pacific) there may be relatively little organic matter falling from the surface.

Life in the OMZ 

Despite the low oxygen conditions, organisms have evolved to live in and around OMZs.  For those organisms, like the vampire squid, special adaptations are needed to either make do with lesser amounts of oxygen or to extract oxygen from the water more efficiently. For example, the giant red mysid (Gnathophausia ingens) continues to live aerobically (using oxygen) in OMZs.  They have highly developed gills with large surface area and thin blood-to-water diffusion distance that enables effective removal of oxygen from the water (up to 90% O2 removal from inhaled water) and an efficient circulatory system with high capacity and high blood concentration of a protein (hemocyanin) that readily binds oxygen.

Another strategy used by some classes of bacteria in the oxygen minimum zones is to use nitrate rather than oxygen, thus drawing down the concentrations of this important nutrient. This process is called denitrification. The oxygen minimum zones thus play an important role in regulating the productivity and ecological community structure of the global ocean. For example, giant bacterial mats floating in the oxygen minimum zone off the west coast of South America may play a key role in the region's extremely rich fisheries, as bacterial mats the size of Uruguay have been found there.

Changes 

OMZs have changed over time due to effects from numerous global chemical and biological processes. To assess these changes, scientists utilize climate models and sediment samples to understand changes to dissolved oxygen in OMZs. Many recent studies of OMZs have focused on their fluctuations over time and how they may be currently changing as a result of climate change.

Some research has aimed to understand how OMZs have changed over geological time scales. Throughout the history of Earth's oceans, OMZs have fluctuated on long time scales, becoming larger or smaller depending on multiple variables. The factors that change OMZs are the amount of oceanic primary production resulting in increased respiration at greater depths, changes in the oxygen supply due to poor ventilation, and amount of oxygen supplied through thermohaline circulation. From recent observations, it is evident that the extent of OMZs has expanded in tropical oceans during the past half century. Vertical expansion of tropical OMZs has reduced the area between the OMZ and surface where oxygen is used by many organisms. Currently, research aims to better understand how OMZ expansion affects food webs in these areas. Studies on OMZ expansion in the tropical Pacific and Atlantic have observed negative effects on fish populations and commercial fisheries that likely occurred from reduced habitat when OMZs shoal.

Other research has attempted to model potential changes to OMZs as a result of rising global temperatures and human impact. This is challenging due to the many factors that could contribute to changes in OMZs. The factors used for modeling change in OMZs are numerous, and in some cases hard to measure or quantify. Some of the processes being studied are changes in oxygen gas solubility as a result of rising ocean temperatures, as well as changes in the amount of respiration and photosynthesis occurring around OMZs. Many studies have concluded that OMZs are expanding in multiple locations, but fluctuations of modern OMZs are still not fully understood. Existing Earth system models project considerable reductions in oxygen and other physical-chemical variables in the ocean due to climate change, with potential ramifications for ecosystems and humans.

See also 
 Dead zone (ecology), localized areas of dramatically reduced oxygen levels, often due to human impacts.
 Ocean deoxygenation

References 

Chemical oceanography
Aquatic ecology
Biological oceanography
Physical oceanography